NZG may refer to:

NZG Models, a German toy manufacturer
Nederlandsch Zendeling Genootschap, a Dutch missionary society
New Zealand Gazette, a government publication